John Donnelly may refer to:

John Donnelly (Australian politician) (1885–1956), Australian politician
John Donnelly (baseball), 19th-century baseball player
John Donnelly (footballer, born 1936) (1936–2009), Scottish footballer (Celtic, Preston North End)
John Donnelly (footballer, born 1961), Scottish footballer (Motherwell, Leeds United)
John Donnelly (hurler) (born 1998), Irish hurler in Kilkenny
John Donnelly (ice hockey) (born 1948), Canadian ice hockey defenceman who played in the WHA with the Ottawa Nationals
John Donnelly (Irish farmer), Irish farmer who was President of the Irish Farmers' Association, 1994–1998
John Donnelly (rowing) (1905–1986), Canadian Olympic rower
John Donnelly (rugby league) (1955–1986), Australian rugby league footballer
John Donnelly (whaler) (1822–1904), New Zealand whaler and gold prospector
John Aiden Donnelly (born 1952), Gardaí officer and recipient of the Scott Medal
John C. Donnelly (1839–1895), American Civil War sailor and Medal of Honor recipient
John H. Donnelly (1857–1926), American politician and government official
John J. Donnelly (born 1952), Vice Admiral in the US Navy
John P. Donnelly (1886–1949), American politician
John Donnelly (playwright), author of Going Forward in 2020 UK drama series Unprecedented

See also 
Joe Donnelly (born 1955), American attorney, diplomat and politician (senator from Indiana)